Chang Woon-soo (19 November 1928 – 28 December 1992) was a South Korean association football player and manager. He won the 1985–86 Asian Club Championship as manager of Daewoo Royals.

Honours

Manager
Daewoo Royals
 K-League: 1984
 Asian Club Championship: 1985–86

Daewoo Royals
 K-League Manager of the Year Award: 1984

References

South Korean footballers
South Korean football managers
Busan IPark managers
1928 births
1992 deaths
Place of death missing
Association football midfielders
Footballers from Seoul